Georg Strasser (10 November 1891 – 4 December 1925) was a German aviator and World War I flying ace with 7 victories.

He died whilst working as a test pilot for Junkers.

Bibliography

1891 births

German World War I flying aces
German World War I pilots
1925 deaths
Military personnel from Baden-Württemberg
German test pilots
Aviators killed in aviation accidents or incidents in Germany
Junkers people